St George's Park is a sports ground in Port Elizabeth, South Africa, it has a capacity of 19,000. The ground have been hosted Test cricket since its first match in 1889 when South Africa played England. 27 Test matches have been played at the ground along with 38 One Day Internationals (ODIs), the first of which was in 1992 when South Africa played India. The ground was first staged to Twenty20 Internationals when South Africa played against West Indies in 2007. The venue has hosted 2 T20I matches so far.

English batsman Phil Mead became the first man to score a Test century at St George's Park when he made 117 against South Africa way back in 1914. 196 runs scored by South African Herschelle Gibbs against India in 2001 stands as the highest score seen at the ground, and a double century is yet to score. Overall, 36 Test centuries have been scored at the ground.

Ten ODI centuries have been scored at St George's Park, and the first by Australian batsman Mark Waugh who scored unbeaten 115 from 125 deliveries against South Africa in 1997. The highest score achieved at the ground is 135 made by Pakistani Saleem Elahi against South Africa in 2002.

Key
 * denotes that the batsman was not out.
 Inns. denotes the number of the innings in the match.
 Balls denotes the number of balls faced in an innings.
 NR denotes that the number of balls was not recorded.
 Parentheses next to the player's score denotes his century number at St George's Park.
 The column title Date refers to the date the match started.
 The column title Result refers to whether the player's team won

Test centuries

The following table summarises the Test centuries scored at St George's Park.

One Day International centuries

The following table summarises the One Day International centuries scored at St George's Park.

References 

Saint Georges Park
Saint Georges Park
Centuries